Ononis alopecuroides is a plant species in the family Fabaceae

Sources

References 

alopecuroides
Flora of Malta